Abbey Bridge is grade B listed road-bridge over the White Cart Water in the centre of Paisley in Scotland. It was erected in 1879, widened in 1933, and comprehensively restored in 2009.

Description
Abbey Bridge connects the south of central Paisley with the area around Paisley Abbey, carrying Bridge Street over the White Carr Water to connect with Cotton Street. It is a beam bridge having two  spans resting at each extreme on masonry-faced concrete abutments, and supported in the centre by a slender masonry pier. The roadway superstructure comprises six steel-plate girders, whilst the footpaths are supported by Warren trusses originally of wrought iron, but latterly of steel plate. The bridge has ornamented parapets incorporating polychrome reliefs of the town’s arms; and facias, originally of cast iron, but latterly replaced by ductile iron cast from the patterns of the originals, on which are mounted gothic lamps manufactured by the Saracen Foundry.

The current Abbey Bridge replaces a 3-arch stone-built bridge dating to around 1763. The new bridge was manufactured by a local shipbuilding company, Hanna, Donald & Wilson and erected in 1879; in 1933 it was widened. In 2009 it was refurbished in a £1.5 million, 6-month project by Raynesway Construction Ltd., involving replacement of the truss sections, parapets and facias in modern materials, but faithful to the original design; and blast-cleaning and painting of the original superstructure. The re-opened bridge, incorporating programmable-colour architectural lighting, has been painted red with gilt highlighting to replace a prior uniform grey colour scheme.

The bridge is classed by Historic Environment Scotland as a Grade B structure, denoting  "buildings of regional or more than local importance, or major examples of some particular period, style or building type which may have been altered."

See also
 List of bridges in the United Kingdom
 List of listed buildings in Paisley, Renfrewshire

References

Beam bridges
Bridges completed in 1879
Buildings and structures in Paisley, Renfrewshire
1879 establishments in Scotland
Listed bridges in Scotland
Category B listed buildings in Renfrewshire